Aaron Daley (born 2 May 1956) is a Jamaican cricketer. He played in twenty-four first-class and sixteen List A matches for the Jamaican cricket team from 1982 to 1991.

See also
 List of Jamaican representative cricketers

References

External links
 

1956 births
Living people
Jamaican cricketers
Jamaica cricketers
People from Saint Catherine Parish